Faith Christian School is a private classical Christian school in Roanoke, Virginia. It was founded in 1997 as an upper school and expanded to include an elementary school in 2004 and a pre-kindergarten in 2014. In August 2007 Faith Christian moved into their building on Buck Mountain Road.

External links
 

Christian schools in Virginia
Classical Christian schools
Educational institutions established in 1997
Private K-12 schools in Virginia
Schools in Roanoke, Virginia
1997 establishments in Virginia